Joe Kieyoomia (November 21, 1919 – February 17, 1997) was a Navajo soldier in New Mexico's 200th Coast Artillery unit who was captured by the Imperial Japanese Army after the fall of the Philippines in 1942 during World War II. Kieyoomia was a POW in Nagasaki at the time of the atomic bombing but survived, reportedly having been shielded from the effects of the bomb by the concrete walls of his cell.

The Japanese tried unsuccessfully to have him decode messages in the "Navajo Code" used by the United States Marine Corps, but although Kieyoomia understood Navajo, the messages sounded like nonsense to him because even though the code was based on the Navajo language, it was decipherable only by individuals specifically trained in its usage.

Kieyoomia is notable for having not only survived the Bataan death march and related internment and torture in a concentration camp, but also being a hibakusha (survivor of an atomic bomb blast).

Capture of the Philippine Islands
The surrender of Bataan would hasten the fall of Corregidor, a month later. Without this final stand however, the Japanese might have quickly overrun all of the U.S. bases in the Pacific. Conflict in Bataan forced them to slow down, giving the allies valuable time to prepare for conflicts such as the Battle of the Coral Sea and the Battle of Midway which followed closely thereafter. Ultimately, Kieyoomia, along with more than 60,000 Filipino and 15,000 American prisoners of war were forced into the infamous Bataan Death March.

Prisoner of war

Initially tortured because his captors thought he was Japanese-American (and therefore a traitor), Kieyoomia suffered months of harsher punishment and beatings before the Japanese accepted his claim to Navajo ancestry.

He survived the Death March that killed thousands of starved U.S. and Philippine soldiers. When the "Navajo Code" had the Japanese baffled, Kieyoomia was questioned and tortured although, as he was deployed to the Philippines with New Mexico's 200th Coast Artillery, he didn't even know about the existence of the code, he could only understand bits and pieces of what the Navajo Code Talkers were saying. Eventually, this led him to tell the Japanese that it sounded like nonsense to him.

As punishment for his inability to crack the code and possibly because the Japanese viewed him as unwilling to crack the code, he was stripped naked and forced to stand for hours in deep snow until he talked. When he was finally allowed to return to his cell, a guard shoved him, causing the soles of his feet to tear as they were frozen to the ground.

After surviving the prison camps, the "hell ships" and the torture, Kieyoomia was a prisoner in Nagasaki when that city was the target of the second atomic bomb dropped by the U.S. Army Air Forces (USAAF). Kieyoomia survived the attack, saying he was protected by the concrete walls of his cell.

After 3½ years as a prisoner of war, he was abandoned in the city for three days after the bombing, but says a Japanese officer finally freed him.

Later life and death

After the war, Kieyoomia returned to the United States and he regained the use of his wounded leg, and his feet healed. He lived to age 77, dying in 1997.

See also
United States Army
Navajo people
Southern Athabaskan languages

References

External links
 “He left his soles overseas”
 How Effective Was Navajo Code?
 

1919 births
1997 deaths
United States Army personnel of World War II
American prisoners of war in World War II
American torture victims
Bataan Death March prisoners
Hibakusha
Navajo military personnel
People from San Juan County, New Mexico
United States Army soldiers
World War II prisoners of war held by Japan
20th-century Native Americans